Virtus Entella, commonly referred to as Entella, is an Italian professional football club based in Chiavari, Liguria.

History

1914: Foundation
The club was founded in 1914 as Foot-Ball Club Entella. It took its name from the river Entella, flowing between Chiavari and Lavagna.

2001: Bankruptcy
Foot-Ball Club Entella went bankrupt in 2001.

2002: Refoundation
It was refounded in 2002 as Unione Sportiva Valle Sturla Entella. In the summer of 2010 it was renamed Virtus Entella, after it had been admitted in Lega Pro Seconda Divisione.  In summer 2012, Virtus Entella was promoted, for the first time, to Lega Pro Prima Divisione by repechage to fill the vacancies created. They completed the 2012–13 season in style, taking part to the promotion playoff, where they were defeated by Lecce in the semi-finals.

In the 2013–14 season, Virtus Entella took part to the Girone A of the Italian third tier, and topped the league for most of the season. On 4 May 2014, a 2–1 away win at Cremonese in the final day of the season ensured Virtus Entella the league championship title and a spot in the 2014–15 Serie B, in what will be the club's first appearance ever in the Italian second tier.

2014: Serie B Period
The team was promoted in Serie B for the first time in history in 2014. In the 2014–15 season they got relegated once again, in the relegation playoffs as they lost to Modena. But after the relegation of Calcio Catania to Lega Pro for sporting fraud it was readmitted to Serie B. Virtus Entella finished 19th at the conclusion of the 2017–18 season and lost a relegation playoff to Ascoli by virtue of being the lower ranked team after the two-legged tie finished 0–0 on aggregate.

2018: Return to Serie C
The team returned to the Italian third tier, now named Serie C for the 2018-19 season. During the season, they also achieved a surprise qualification to the round of 16 of the 2018–19 Coppa Italia, defeating Genoa on penalties during the process. That season they won the Serie C and thus earned promotion to the Serie B.

Current squad
.

Out on loan

Honours
Serie C1:
Winner: 2013-14, 2018-19,
Serie D:
Winner: 1959-60, 1963-64, 1984-85,

Notable former players

  Naser Aliji
  Nicolas Cinalli
  Cristiano Bacci
  Manlio Bacigalupo
  Gianpaolo Castorina
  Francesco Conti
  Gino Ferrer Callegari
  Rosario Di Vincenzo
  Matteo Matteazzi
  Simone Pasticcio
  Silvano Raggio Garibaldi
  Luciano Spalletti
  Giuliano Taccola
  Stefano Vavoli
Nicolo Zaniolo

Presidents and managers
Antonio Gozzi has been the President of the Virtus Entella since 2007. He was arrested and released in March 2015.

References

External links
Official site

 
Football clubs in Liguria
Association football clubs established in 1914
1914 establishments in Italy